Rocky Rapids is a hamlet in central Alberta, Canada within Brazeau County.

Demographics 
The population of Rocky Rapids according to the 2005 municipal census conducted by Brazeau County is 317.

Economy 
Located within the Pembina oil field, the economy of Rocky Rapids is based mostly on oil and gas.

Arts and culture 
The Easyfest Music Festival used to be held in Rocky Rapids but is now defunct.

Amenities 
Rocky Rapids has an outdoor skating rink, basketball hoops, and a park with playground amenities. A pedestrian path links Rocky Rapids with Drayton Valley to the south.

Government 
Rocky Rapids is located within Division 4 of Brazeau County. On council, Division 4 is represented by Councillor Kara Westerlund (Dykstra), who was elected in the 2010 Alberta municipal elections. Wes Tweedle is the reeve of Brazeau County.

Transportation 
Rocky Rapids is linked to Highway 22 to the west via Township Road 500.

See also 
List of communities in Alberta
List of hamlets in Alberta

References

External links 
 Brazeau County official website

Brazeau County
Hamlets in Alberta